Stela Olteanu (born 25 February 1972) is a Romanian long-distance runner. She competed in the women's 5000 metres at the 1996 Summer Olympics.

References

1972 births
Living people
Athletes (track and field) at the 1996 Summer Olympics
Romanian female long-distance runners
Olympic athletes of Romania
Place of birth missing (living people)